Tom Gerhardt (born 12 December 1957) is a German actor and comedian.

Life 
Gerhardt was born in Cologne, and studied German studies and philosophy. After his university studies, Gerhardt worked for German newspaper Express in Cologne. Since the 1990s, he has worked as an actor in different films.

Filmography 

 1994: 
 1997: 
 1998: The Polar Bear
 2003: Pura Vida Ibiza
 2004: Germanikus
 2004: Resident Evil: Apocalypse
 2005: 7 Dwarves – Men Alone in the Wood
 2005: Siegfried
 2009: 
 2010: Freche Mädchen 2
 2011: Die Superbullen
 2011: Der Blender

Television comedy series 
 1999–2010: Hausmeister Krause – Ordnung muss sein

External links 
 

German male comedians
1957 births
Living people
Actors from Cologne
German male film actors
German male television actors
Sat.1 people